The 1925 Missouri Tigers football team was an American football team that represented the University of Missouri in the Missouri Valley Conference (MVC) during the 1925 college football season. The team compiled a 6–1–1 record (5–1 against Missouri Valley opponents), won the Missouri Valley championship, and outscored all opponents by a combined total of 110 to 44. The team was ranked No. 5 in the nation in the Dickinson System ratings released in January 1926. Gwinn Henry was the head coach for the third of nine seasons. 

This was the final season for the team playing its home games at Rollins Field in Columbia, Missouri, before moving to Memorial Stadium the following season.

Schedule

References

Missouri
Missouri Tigers football seasons
Missouri Valley Conference football champion seasons
Missouri Tigers football